Tifakan (also Romanized as Ţīfakān and Tifkān; also known as Tīfakān-e Pā’īn, Tikakun, Ţīqakān, and Titakun) is a village in Siyahu Rural District, Fin District, Bandar Abbas County, Hormozgan Province, Iran. At the 2006 census, its population was 123, in 35 families.

References 

Populated places in Bandar Abbas County